The Coastal League is a high school athletic league that is part of the CIF Southern Section.

Members
 California Academy of Math & Science
 Geffen Academy
 Hawthorne MSA
 Lennox Academy
 New Roads School
 Rolling Hills Preparatory School
 Vistamar School
 Wildwood School

References

CIF Southern Section leagues